J. Mercykutty Amma (born 30 September 1955) is an Indian politician and she was  the Minister for Fisheries, Harbour Engineering, Cashew Industry; Fisheries University, Government of Kerala. She was representing the Kundara constituency in Kollam, Kerala.

Personal life
J. Mercykutty Amma was born to Jainamma and Francis at Munrothuruthu on 30 September 1955. She is married to B. Thulaseedhara Kurup, the President, Centre of Indian Trade Unions, Kollam.

Education
Mercykutty Amma is a postgraduate in Malayalam and has completed LL.B. course.

Political career
Mercykutty Amma occupied her seat after a long journey in left wing politics beginning as a student activist. She entered politics as an activist of Students Federation of India (SFI) during 1974. She was SFI office bearer at Fatima Matha National College, Kollam and Sree Narayana College, Kollam. She served as SFI State Vice President and All India Vice President up to 1985.

She held various positions in CITU and in Communist Party of India (Marxist). Smt. Mercykutty Amma was the District Committee President of Matsyathozhilali (Fishermen) Federation, Kollam up to 2012 and was the State Vice President during 1987 to 2005. She was also the District treasurer of Coir Workers Union, Kollam up to 1989 and the President of Khadi Workers Federation. She was also the Chairperson of Kerala State Co-operative Federation for Fisheries Development Ltd. (Matsyafed).

Now, Member, State Committee CPI (M); All India Vice President and State Secretary, CITU; Vice President, Kerala Cashew Workers Centre.

She was first elected to Kerala Legislative Assembly in 1987 (26 March 1987 – 17 June 1991). She was again elected to Kerala Legislative Assembly in 1996 (20 May 1996 – 13 May 2001). Mercykutty Amma was elected to the Kerala Legislative Assembly third time in 2016 and became Minister in charge of the portfolios of Fisheries, Harbour Engineering and Cashew Industry.

She had contested the 2021 Kerala Legislative Assembly election from Kundara assembly constituency and was defeated by P. C. Vishnunath of Indian National Congress by 4,454 votes.

References

1957 births
Living people
Communist Party of India (Marxist) politicians from Kerala
Women in Kerala politics
20th-century Indian women politicians
20th-century Indian politicians
Politicians from Kollam district
21st-century Indian women politicians
21st-century Indian politicians